This is a list of Indian chefs, who are known for their work in the culinary arts and preparing various types of Indian dishes and recipes.

Indian chefs

Some of the notable Indian chefs include:

 Aarti Sequeira (1978–Present)
 Anjum Anand (1971–Present)
 Surjan Singh Jolly
 Chef Damodharan
 Farrokh Khambata
 Floyd Cardoz (1960–2020)
 Gaggan Anand
 Garima Arora 
 Harpal Sokhi
 Hemant Bhagwani
 Imitiaz Qureshi 
 Jacob Sahaya Kumar Aruni (1972-2012)
 Kumar Mahadevan (1960–Present)
 Kunal Kapur 
 M.S. Krishna Iyer
 Madhur Jaffrey (1933–Present)
 Maneet Chauhan (1976–Present)
 Manish Mehrotra (1974–Present)
 Manju Malhi
 Manjunath Mural (1973–Present)
 Mehboob Alam Khan
 Narayana Reddy
 Narayanan Krishnan (1981–Present)
 Nelson Wang (1950–Present)
Nilesh Limaye (1972–Present)
Nita Mehta
Pankaj Bhadouria
Rajesh Mazumder
Raji Jallepalli (1949–2002)
Ranveer Brar (1978–Present)
Ritu Dalmia (1973–Present)
Ripudaman Handa
Romy Gill (1972–Present )
Sanjay Thumma (1970–Present)
Sanjeev Kapoor (1964–Present)
Saransh Goila (1987–Present)
Shazia Khan
Shipra Khanna (1981–Present)
Suvir Saran (1972–Present)
Tarla Dalal (1936- 2013)
Venkatesh Bhat
Vikas Khanna (1971–Present)
Vikram Sunderam
Vineet Bhatia
Vishwesh Bhatt
Vivek Singh (1971–Present)

See also
 List of chefs

References

Indian chefs
Chefs of Indian cuisine
Indian
Chefs